Saint Kitts and Nevis have participated in eight Commonwealth Games. Their first appearance came in 1978 as part of Saint Christopher-Nevis-Anguilla, but they did not appear again until 1990. They have won a single medal, gold in the 2002 100 metres from Kim Collins.

Medals

References

 
Nations at the Commonwealth Games